Stromeyerite is a sulfide mineral of copper and silver, with the chemical formula AgCuS. It forms opaque blue grey to dark blue orthorhombic crystals.

It was discovered in 1832 in Central Bohemia Region, Czech Republic, and named after the German chemist, Friedrich Stromeyer who performed the first analysis of the mineral.

See also
List of minerals
List of minerals named after people

References

Copper(I) minerals
Silver minerals
Sulfide minerals
Orthorhombic minerals
Minerals in space group 63